Propargylamine is the organic compound with the formula HC≡CCH2NH2.  It is a colorless liquid that is used as a precursor to other compounds.  Early syntheses used the Delepine reaction involving propargyl halides and hexamethylenetetramine.

References

Amines
Propargyl compounds